Steve Dallas is a fictional character in the American comic strips of Berke Breathed, most famously Bloom County in the 1980s.

He was first introduced as an obnoxious frat boy in the college strip The Academia Waltz, which ran in the University of Texas's Daily Texan during 1978 and 1979. Steve then reappears in Bloom County after graduation as a self-employed, unscrupulous lawyer.

He was the first character to have been featured in all four of Breathed's comic strips. He appeared regularly, albeit much older, in the Sunday-only Opus.

On June 12, 2013, Steve Dallas made a guest appearance in Pearls Before Swine.

In Bloom County

In the early days of Bloom County, Steve was usually seen hitting on schoolteacher Bobbi Harlow, whom he briefly dated and failed to woo back once she left him for Cutter John. He frequently dated Bobbi's dimwitted cousin, Quiche Loraine, to make her jealous (the plan did not work).

Most residents of Bloom County, especially women, either despised him or indifferently tolerated his presence. The one exception was Opus the Penguin, who idolized him and tagged along with him like a younger brother. Steve often used Opus' hero worship to manipulate the hapless penguin into doing his dirty work (although occasionally Steve was heard to have threatened Opus into helping him instead).

He was often shown to hold strongly conservative political positions (albeit to a lesser extent than in The Academia Waltz), to the extent that the Reagan White House's policies were only sometimes enough to satisfy him. (He remarked early in the President's tenure that he thought "Haig and the generals should run Reagan and his liberal pack right out of the White House.") However, both he and the other (mostly liberal) characters became less hostile to Reagan's policies as both the strip's run and Reagan's tenure ran on. In another strip, a flashback of Dallas's teenage years showed him reading conservative author William F. Buckley's book God and Man at Yale.

Dallas did not, however, seem to hold the traditionalist religious moral principles that were associated with Reagan and his allies on the right at the time, as his womanizing and lack of religious practice would indicate. He once went so far as to say that, "My God. We've got to get Carter back in the White House" after associating Ronald Reagan's presidency with the end of the Sexual revolution and therefore the end of his conquests at "Bob's Bar & Flesh Market". Like most conservatives (and liberals, and others) portrayed in Breathed's work, Steve's political positions do not appear to stem from actual convictions.

As a lawyer, Steve took on hopeless cases defending psychotic and obviously guilty criminals and murderers, much to the chagrin of his overbearing mother. On one occasion, he did win a case (his client had allegedly murdered her husband with an axe), but only because the jury cared more about what the woman wore than whether or not she was innocent (at one point, she found a plastic picnic knife and supposedly tried to make a fillet out of a CNN cameraman). A bachelor throughout the entire run of the strip, he was the most aggressive womanizer and most blatant male chauvinist of all the eligible males in the cartoon.

Outside of the courts, Steve's professionalism was questionable. In one instance he attempts to collect from a past due client by saying "Attention criminal pervert, where the hell is my dough, you twisted goon?". Opus, however, who at the time is working as a paralegal, writes in the actual letter "We still await payment of your legal fee".

He was briefly the manager of Billy and the Boingers, a Def Leppard-esque glam metal band consisting of Opus, Bill the Cat, and Hodge-Podge.

Steve briefly became a different person shortly after he was abducted by aliens. On board their spaceship, the aliens had originally planned to transplant Elvis Presley's brain into Steve's head. However, after Steve threatened the aliens with a lawsuit, they decided to perform the "Gephardtization" process on him instead, which was the same procedure used previously on then-U.S. House Majority Leader Dick Gephardt to completely reverse opinions and attitudes. After being presumed dead by the residents of Bloom County, Steve was zapped back to earth a few days later. To the whole county's amazement, he was now a sensitive, caring liberal and feminist. He stopped wearing his trademark sunglasses, quit smoking, got a perm (thinking it made him look like Alan Alda), and canvassed for Jesse Jackson's 1988 Presidential campaign.

This carried on for about a year, until Steve found out that his girlfriend Gladys was cheating on him with the bassist for "Guns 'n Spittle" and Opus had been using his toothbrush to comb his nose hair. Devastated, he resolved to forever avenge feminine betrayal, and by doing so, he put his trademark sunglasses back on. He immediately returned to his old, cantankerous self.

During the closing down of Bloom County in the final days of the strip, Steve seeks employment in other strips. He is seen (in the strip) to land a guest spot in Cathy, much to the title character's horror. (Many years later, in the revived Bloom County, the Cathy character slept with Steve Dallas, and regretted it in the morning.)

In the 21st century reboot of Bloom County Steve remains a major character.

Outland and Opus

At the end of Outland in 1995, Steve came out of the closet and admitted he was gay. In his final appearance in the comic, he had married a man (Doonesbury's Mark Slackmeyer) and was thinking about adopting children.

However, in Opus nine years later, Steve was back to his babe-mongering ways after enrolling in the "Rev. Doogle De-Poofta" which used shock therapy to attempt to "cure" homosexuality; in a form of conversion therapy. Steve was depicted as a middle-aged man with thinning hair and a noticeable paunch.

Steve was also reunited with his long-lost son Augie (presumably named after Augie Doggie), and reluctantly took on the role of father figure. The August 26, 2007 strip implied that he was romantically involved with the recently re-introduced character Lola Granola, a former love interest of Opus.

The "real" Steve Dallas
Breathed has stated that Dallas was based on a real person.
Steve Dallas...a frat-boy lawyer who I knew in school. He's never written me. I suspect he was shot by an annoyed girlfriend, which saved me many legal fees
The name "Steve Dallas" also appears in the classic and cynical noir film Sweet Smell of Success, wherein a cool jazz musician named Steve Dallas dates the wrong girl (kid sister of a sinister and influential columnist played by Burt Lancaster) and gets set up for a drug bust as a result.

In the 2013 movie Are You Here, Owen Wilson plays 'Steve Dallas', an inveterate womanizer. In one scene, Dallas is slumped in a recliner wearing sunglasses just as his Bloom County namesake often does.

Notes

References
Breathed, Berke (1990). Classics of Western Literature. Boston: Little, Brown & Company. .

Bloom County characters
Comics characters introduced in 1978
Fictional Republicans (United States)
Fictional lawyers